Amakye and Dede is a Ghanaian romantic comedy movie released in 2016 and directed by Kofi Asamoah. The movie is centered on two best friends who fell in love with the same girl. The film sold the most tickets on the date of it was  premiered. The movie was themed as the “Easter Movie” because it was premiered during Easter on 26 March, 2016 at the Silverbirds Cinemas WestHills Mall and Accra Mall.

Cast 
 Majid Michel
 Kalybos
Ahuofi Patri
 John Dumelo
 Roselyn Ngissah
 Salma Mumin
 Umar Krupp
Emelia Brobbey
 Moesha Buduong
 Grace Nortey
 Fred Nuamah

Reception 
Ghana Film Industry gave the film a 9.5 out of 10.

References 

2016 films
Ghanaian comedy films